Johannelund metro station is a station on the Green line of the Stockholm metro.

The station was inaugurated on 1 November 1956 as part of an extension from Vällingby to Hässelby gård. Up until October 1997 the station was only in use in the daytime, and was closed weekends. It is the only Stockholm metro station with side platforms instead of the island platform present at most other stations.

Only 1,250 passengers travel from Johannelund station daily, making it the least used in the Stockholm metro.

References

Green line (Stockholm metro) stations
Railway stations opened in 1956